El Paso County is the westernmost county in the U.S. state of Texas. As of the 2020 census, the population was 865,657, making it the ninth-most populous county in the state of Texas. Its seat is the city of El Paso, the sixth-most populous city in Texas and the 22nd-most populous city in the United States. The county was created in 1850 and later organized in 1871.

El Paso is short for "El Paso del Norte", which is Spanish for "The Pass of the North". It is named for the pass the Rio Grande creates through the mountains on either side of the river. The county is northeast of the Mexico–United States border.

El Paso County is included in the El Paso metropolitan area. Along with Hudspeth County, it is one of two counties of Texas entirely in the Mountain Time Zone (all other Texas counties except for northwestern Culberson County use Central Time). El Paso County is one of nine counties that comprise the Trans-Pecos region of West Texas.

Geography

Adjacent counties and municipalities
 Doña Ana County, New Mexico – northwest
 Otero County, New Mexico – northeast
 Hudspeth County, Texas – east
 Guadalupe, Chihuahua, Mexico – south
 Juárez, Chihuahua, Mexico – south
 Práxedis G. Guerrero, Chihuahua, Mexico – southeast

National protected area
 Chamizal National Memorial
 El Camino Real de Tierra Adentro National Historic Trail (part)

Major highways

Demographics

Note: the US Census treats Hispanic/Latino as an ethnic category. This table excludes Latinos from the racial categories and assigns them to a separate category. Hispanics/Latinos can be of any race.

As of the 2010 United States census, there were 800,647 people living in the county. 82.1% were White of largely Hispanic descent, 10.5% of other races, 3.1% African American or Black, 2.5% of two or more races, 1.0% Asian, 0.8% Native American and 0.1% Pacific Islander. 82.2% were Latino (of any race).

As of the census of 2000, there were 679,622 people, 210,022 households, and 166,127 families living in the county.  The population density was 671 people per square mile (259/km2).  There were 224,447 housing units at an average density of 222 per square mile (86/km2). The city was 78.23% Latino of any race. The racial makeup of the county was 73.95% White, 17.91% from other races, 3.06% African American or Black, 0.82% Native American, 0.98% Asian, 0.10% Pacific Islander, and 3.19% from two or more races.

There were 210,022 households, out of which 44.90% had children under the age of 18 living with them, 56.70% were married couples living together, 18.00% had a female householder with no husband present, and 20.90% were non-families. 17.80% of all households were made up of individuals, and 6.70% had someone living alone who was 65 years of age or older.  The average household size was 3.18 and the average family size was 3.63.

In the county, the population was spread out, with 32.00% under the age of 18, 10.60% from 18 to 24, 29.30% from 25 to 44, 18.40% from 45 to 64, and 9.70% who were 65 years of age or older.  The median age was 30 years. For every 100 females there were 93.20 males.  For every 100 females age 18 and over, there were 88.70 males.

The median income for a household in the county was $31,051, and the median income for a family was $33,410. Males had a median income of $26,882 versus $20,722 for females. The per capita income for the county was $13,421.  About 20.50% of families and 23.80% of the population were below the poverty line, including 31.50% of those under age 18 and 18.50% of those age 65 or over.

Politics
Most of El Paso County is included in the 16th Congressional District in the U.S House, represented by Democrat Veronica Escobar. A small eastern portion of the county is in the 23rd Congressional District, represented since 2021 by Republican Tony Gonzales. El Paso County is historically Democratic and the 2008 presidential election was no exception. Democrat Barack Obama won 66% of the vote with 121,589 votes even though he lost the entire state of Texas by about 946,000 votes. Republican John McCain won 33% of the vote in El Paso County with 61,598 votes. Other candidates won 1% of the vote. In 2004, Democrat John F. Kerry won El Paso County but by a smaller margin than Barack Obama. John Kerry won 56% of the vote and 95,142 votes. Republican George W. Bush won 43% of the vote with 73,261 votes. Other candidates won less than 1% of the vote.

The El Paso County Sheriff's Office is headquartered in an unincorporated area in El Paso County. At one point it was headquartered within the City of El Paso. The Leo Samaniego Law Enforcement Complex is adjacent to the sheriff's office headquarters.

Like all Texas counties, El Paso County is governed by a Commissioners Court, which consists of a County Judge, who is elected county-wide, and four County Commissioners, who represent individual precincts. While the County Judge possesses some traditional powers of a judge, the County Judge functions primarily as the chief executive of the county.  The County Judge presides over Commissioners Court meetings, casts one vote on Commissioners Court (as do County Commissioners), and lacks veto authority.

The El Paso County Judge is Ricardo Samaniego, and the county commissioners are Carlos Leon (Precinct 1), David Stout (Precinct 2), Iliana Holguin (Precinct 3), and Carl L. Robinson(Precinct 4). The commissioners and the county judge are all Democrats.

Vogt was appointed County Judge in October 2017 by the County Commissioners, following County Judge Veronica Escobar's resignation to run for Congress. He was previously Escobar's chief of staff. He will serve the remainder of her term, through the end of 2018. Leon and Perez were first elected to their positions in 2012, were re-elected in 2016, and have been in office since 2013. Haggerty and Stout were first elected to their positions in 2014, and have been in office since 2015.

The first woman to hold elected office in El Paso County was a teacher, Myra Carroll Winkler, who was elected as superintendent of El Paso County schools in 1912.

Communities

Cities 
El Paso
Horizon City
San Elizario
Socorro

Towns 
Anthony
Clint

Village
Vinton

Census-designated places

 Agua Dulce
 Butterfield
 Canutillo
 Fabens
 Homestead Meadows North
 Homestead Meadows South
 Morning Glory
 Prado Verde
 Sparks
 Tornillo
 Westway

Military Base
 Fort Bliss

Unincorporated communities
 Montana Vista
 Newman

Economy 

As of 2021, El Paso County had a total GDP of around $30 billion and $35,000 per capita.

Education
School districts include:
 Anthony Independent School District
 Canutillo Independent School District
 Clint Independent School District
 El Paso Independent School District
 Fabens Independent School District
 San Elizario Independent School District
 Socorro Independent School District
 Tornillo Independent School District
 Ysleta Independent School District

All of the county is in the service area of El Paso Community College.

See also

El Paso Holocaust Museum and Study Center  
List of museums in West Texas 
National Border Patrol Museum
National Register of Historic Places listings in El Paso County, Texas
Recorded Texas Historic Landmarks in El Paso County

References

External links
El Paso County Official web site
El Paso County in Handbook of Texas Online at the University of Texas
 Historic El Paso County materials, hosted by the Portal to Texas History.
Fort Bliss National Cemetery Disgrace Video

 
Trans-Pecos
1871 establishments in Texas
Majority-minority counties in Texas
Hispanic and Latino American culture in Texas